Coker Butte is a summit in the U.S. state of Oregon.

Coker Butte was named after one C. W. Coker.

References

Buttes of Oregon
Mountains of Jackson County, Oregon
Mountains of Oregon